= Microlia machadoi =

Scientific classification
- Kingdom: Animalia
- Phylum: Arthropoda
- Class: Insecta
- Order: Coleoptera
- Suborder: Polyphaga
- Infraorder: Staphyliniformia
- Family: Staphylinidae
- Genus: Microlia
- Species: M. machadoi

Binomial name
- Microlia machadoi Bortoluzzi, Caron & Silveira, 2016

Species of beetle

Microlia machadoi is a species of rove beetle first found in Brazil. It is a pollen-feeder. The species differs from M. pentamera and M. tetramera by possessing a curved spine-like process in the posterior margin of its third tergum.
